Everything but the Truth is a 1956 American Eastmancolor comedy film directed by Jerry Hopper. It stars Maureen O'Hara and John Forsythe.

Plot
A schoolboy who has been urged to always tell the truth blurts out that an uncle of his has received a payoff from a politician. Chaos ensues, as teacher Joan Madison fights the school principal's decision to expel the boy from classes and enlists a newspaper columnist, Ernie Miller, to help support her cause.

Cast
 Maureen O'Hara as Joan Madison
 John Forsythe as Ernie Miller
 Tim Hovey as Willie Taylor
 Frank Faylen as Mac MCmillen
 Les Tremayne as Lawrence "Larry" Everett

References

External links
 
 

1956 films
1956 comedy films
American comedy films
Films directed by Jerry Hopper
Universal Pictures films
1950s English-language films
1950s American films